Sin el-Fil ( / ALA-LC: Sinn al-Fīl) is a suburb east of Beirut in the Matn District of the Mount Lebanon Governorate, Lebanon.

Overview

Etymology
The name literally means 'ivory': "tooth" (sinn) of "the elephant" (al-fīl).  Being geographically closer to the ancient city of Antioch and far remote from natural elephant habitat, it is believed that the town name may have been a derogation of Saint Theophilus of Antioch.

Geography
With a rich red soil and moderate precipitation (but available ground water irrigation) the agricultural land of Sin el Fil in the early 20th century sprawled into a densely populated suburb. The natural landscape of the late century was dominated by stone pine. The Beirut River runs west of Sin el Fil and separates the town from the capital, Beirut.

Demographics

Archaeology
Collections of archaeological material from this limestone "hogsback" were made from the gullies to the south of the main road on the slopes of forested hills. The recovery areas were described as "ravines sinueuses" by Raoul Describes after making a collection in 1921. Other Jesuits who made collections from the area included Godefroy Zumoffen in 1908, Paul Bovier-Lapierre and Auguste Bergy as well as Mouterde, Gigues, Lorraine Copeland and Peter Wescombe. E. Passemard suggested that two of the trihedral pieces collected by Paul Bovier-Lapierre were Chalossian. Describes published some of the material as Acheulean but the bulk of the material was very mixed including many indeterminate Neolithic pieces including Trihedral Neolithic and Heavy Neolithic forms. There was also a Roman occupation on the flat fields above the slopes. Some archaeological material from Sin el Fil is in the National Museum of Beirut and the Museum of Lebanese Prehistory.

On 1st March 1990 Sin el Fin was the scene of heavy fighting between Samir Geagea’s Lebanese Forces (LF) and parts of the Lebanese Army loyal to General Michel Aoun. It was the last offensive in Aoun’s failed attempt to take control of Christian East Beirut and caused extensive damage and many casualties.

Twin towns – sister cities
  Prato, Italy, since 2008

References and footnotes

External links
 Sinn El Fil, Localiban 
 Municipality of Sin el Fil (Arabic)

Populated places in the Matn District
Maronite Christian communities in Lebanon

Archaeological sites in Lebanon
Trihedral Neolithic sites
Heavy Neolithic sites